Joenal Castma (born 4 March 1976) is an American-born Haitian retired footballer who played as a forward for the Haiti national team. He also played professionally for clubs in the United States and Poland.

Player

Club
Castma began his college soccer career at St. John's University in 1994. In 1996, he transferred to the University of Massachusetts Amherst, playing on the men’s soccer team in 1996 and 1997. In 1997, he also played for the Long Island Rough Riders U-23 team. In 1998, he turned professional with the Worcester Wildfire of the USISL A-League. In April 1999, he signed with the Minnesota Thunder. He was traded by the Thunder to the Pittsburgh Riverhounds where he played until 2001. He also played one game for Polish club Lechia Gdańsk during the 1999-2000 season.

International
In 2000, Castma was called up by the Haiti national football team. He played for the team in both 2000 and 2002.

Coach
On 12 August 2003, Castma was hired by the East Allegheny Wildcats Men’s Soccer Team as a head coach. They faltered down the stretch going 2-6 in their last 8 to miss the playoffs by 1 game.

On 17 April 2006, Castma was hired by the University of Pittsburgh as an assistant with the women’s soccer team.

Director
On 5 January 2008, Castma was hired by Allegheny Force FC as the Director of Coaching and Player development which is based out of the east part of Pittsburgh. In this role he has sent numerous players to Div 1, 2, and 3 schools, many of which who received scholarships at these programs.

Executive Director of Coaching
In June 2018, Castma was hired by Beadling Soccer Club as the New Executive Director of Coaching and Player development.

References

External links
 Pittsburgh Panthers: Joenal Castma

1976 births
Living people
Citizens of Haiti through descent
Haitian footballers
Association football forwards
Lechia Gdańsk players
Haiti international footballers
Haitian expatriate footballers
Haitian expatriate sportspeople in Poland
Expatriate footballers in Poland
American soccer players
Minnesota Thunder players
Pittsburgh Riverhounds SC players
St. John's Red Storm men's soccer players
Worcester Wildfire players
UMass Minutemen soccer players
A-League (1995–2004) players
African-American soccer players
American sportspeople of Haitian descent
American expatriate soccer players
American expatriate sportspeople in Poland
21st-century African-American sportspeople
20th-century African-American sportspeople